The Khoit Tsenkher Cave Rock Paintings are found in Mankhan Sum, Khovd Province, Mongolia.

Site description
Originating in the Paleolithic period, the rock art found in Khoit Tsenkher Cave includes symbols and animal forms painted from the walls up to the ceiling. Stags, buffalo, oxen, ibex, lions, Argali sheep, antelopes, camels, elephants, ostriches, and other animal pictorials are present, often forming a palimpsest of overlapping images.  The paintings appear brown or red in color, and are stylistically similar to other Paleolithic rock art from around the world but are unlike any other examples in Mongolia.

World Heritage status
This site was added to the UNESCO World Heritage Tentative List on August 1, 1996 in the Cultural category.

References

External links
 Khoit tsenkher cave rock painting - UNESCO World Heritage Centre Accessed 2009-03-02.

Rock art in Mongolia
World Heritage Tentative List